USS Timor was purchased at Sag Harbor, New York on 30 October 1861.  She was sunk as part of the Stone Fleet at Maffitts channel in Charleston harbor on 25 or 26 January 1862.

See also

Union Navy
Union Blockade

References

Ships of the Stone Fleet
Ships of the Union Navy
Scuttled vessels
Maritime incidents in January 1862
Shipwrecks of the American Civil War
Shipwrecks of the Carolina coast